Delicatessen is a 1991 French post-apocalyptic black comedy film directed by Jean-Pierre Jeunet and Marc Caro, starring Dominique Pinon and Marie-Laure Dougnac. It was released in North America as "presented by Terry Gilliam."

Plot
In a dilapidated apartment building in post-apocalyptic France, food is in short supply and grain is used as currency. On the ground floor is a butcher's shop, run by the landlord, Clapet, who posts job opportunities in the newspaper to lure victims to the building, whom he murders and butchers as a cheap source of meat to sell to his tenants.

Following the murder of the last worker, unemployed circus clown Louison applies for the vacant position. Louison proves to be a superb worker with a spectacular trick knife, and the butcher is reluctant to kill him too quickly. During Louison's routine maintenance, he acquires a package dropped by a mailman. Louison delivers the package to Clapet's daughter, Julie, who says the package contains confections and invites him to join her that evening. Louison and Julie's relationship blossoms into romance.  At the same time, several of the tenants fall under Louison's boyish charms, worrying others who are more anxious for their own safety should they require meat.

Clapet tells apartment tenant Marcel Tapioca that his rent is late and he must give up his mother-in-law as payment. That evening, Julie begs her father to let Louison go, knowing that Clapet is killing tenants for meat. She goes to her apartment, unwraps a newspaper in her refrigerator and sees an article about the Troglodistes, a group of vegetarian rebels who live underground. Julie descends into the sewers to make contact with the feared Troglodistes, whom she persuades to help rescue Louison.

After the apparent butchering of Tapioca's mother-in-law, the Troglodistes go through the sewer pipes and attempt to capture Louison, but end up mistakenly capturing tenant Mademoiselle Plusse instead. Meanwhile, as Julie and Louison watch television, Clapet ascends to the roof, shaking the television antenna to lure Louison into going up to fix it. Attacking Louison with a cleaver, Clapet's attempt to kill him is foiled by an unexpected electrical explosion in one of the apartments.

Clapet, along with some tenants, storms Louison's room in another attempt to murder him. Louison and Julie take refuge in a bathroom and flood it, floor to ceiling, until Clapet opens the door, releasing the flood and washing the attackers away. Mademoiselle Plusse escapes the sewers, finds Louison's boomerang knife, and gives it to Clapet. Clapet throws the knife towards Louison, but inadvertently kills himself. Louison and Julie play music together on the roof of the now peaceful apartment building.

Cast

 Dominique Pinon as Louison
 Marie-Laure Dougnac as Julie Clapet
 Jean-Claude Dreyfus as Clapet
 Karin Viard as Mademoiselle Plusse
 Ticky Holgado as Marcel Tapioca
 Edith Ker as Grandmother
 Rufus as Robert Kube
 Jacques Mathou as Roger
 Howard Vernon as Frog Man
 Marc Caro as Fox

Reception
The film was received well critically. Variety called it "a zany little film that's a startling and clever debut." Empire called it a "fair bet for cultdom, a lot more likeable than its subject matter suggests, and simply essential viewing for vegetarians". Inverse described the movie as having "striking visual aesthetic inspired by the monochrome photography of French-Hungarian photographer Brassaï, and the fantasy films of Terry Gilliam".

Not all reviews were positive, however, with The New York Times saying "its last half-hour is devoted chiefly to letting the characters wreck the sets, and quite literally becomes a washout when the bathtub overflows."

Although Delicatessen examines the resistance movement in German-occupied Europe, few film critics commented on this theme upon its initial release.

Review aggregator Rotten Tomatoes gave it an approval rating of 89% from a total of 54 reviews with an average rating of 7.76/10. The website's critical consensus reads, "Director Jean-Pierre Jeunet deftly combines horror, sci-fi, and humor in Delicatessen, a morbid comedy set in a visually ravishing futuristic dystopia." Metacritic gave it 66 out of 100 out of a total of 17 reviews, indicating "generally favorable reviews."

Accolades
The film has won and been nominated for several important European awards. At the César Awards it won Best Editing, Best Debut, Best Production Design and Best Writing, at the European Film Awards it won Best Set Design, at Fantasporto the Audience Jury Award, at the Guild of German Art House Cinemas Best Foreign Film, at Sitges Best Actor, Best Director, Best Original Soundtrack and the Prize of Catalan Screenwriter's Critic and Writer's Association. At the Tokyo International Film Festival, it won the Gold Award. The film was nominated for the Grand Prix of the Belgian Syndicate of Cinema Critics. It also received nominations for those award ceremonies as well as for the BAFTAs.

References

External links

 
 
 

1991 films
1990s black comedy films
1990s science fiction films
French science fiction comedy-drama films
French post-apocalyptic films
French black comedy films
Films directed by Jean-Pierre Jeunet
Films directed by Marc Caro
Best First Feature Film César Award winners
Films about cannibalism
Films set in apartment buildings
Miramax films
1990s dystopian films
French survival films
1991 directorial debut films
1991 comedy films
1990s French films